Laughter in the Dark is a 1969 French-British romantic drama film directed by Tony Richardson and starring Nicol Williamson and Anna Karina. It was based on the novel of the same name by Vladimir Nabokov.

Plot
For the film, the story's setting was changed from 1930s Berlin to the Swinging London of the 1960s.

A wealthy married 40-year-old art critic called Sir Edward More (Nicol Williamson) falls in love with a sixteen-year-old girl called Margot (Anna Karina).

However, she later cheats on him with another man (Jean-Claude Drouot) which eventually leads to him losing his eyesight while they argue in his car about it and crash into another car when he finds out about it. She continues with the affair but as Edward is now blind, she can have it right in front of him.

Eventually, he finds out about the still ongoing affair and confronts her with a gun. But she fatally shoots him with it and then runs off while his dead body lies on the floor.

Cast
 Nicol Williamson as Sir Edward More
 Anna Karina as Margot
 Jean-Claude Drouot as Herve Tourace
 Peter Bowles as Paul
 Siân Phillips as Lady Elizabeth More
 Sebastian Breaks as Brian
 Kate O'Toole as Amelia More
 Edward Gardner as Driver
 Sheila Burrell as Miss Porly
 Willoughby Goddard as Colonel
 Basil Dignam as Dealer
 Philippa Urquhart as Philippa

Production

Casting
Nicol Williamson was brought in as a very late replacement for Richard Burton, who had already shot several scenes. The director, Tony Richardson, found Burton's lack of punctuality intolerable.

Filming
The film was shot on location in England and Majorca.

Release
The film drew respectable reviews, but for reasons that are unclear, it was subsequently removed from distribution. The film has only been shown twice on British television, (in 1974 and 1981 on BBC2), and has not been released on any home video format.

Cancelled remake
Laszlo Papas was slated to direct a 1986 remake of the film which would have starred Mick Jagger as Axel Rex and Rebecca De Mornay as the young seductress; De Mornay was replaced by Maryam d'Abo after disagreements with the director, but ultimately the project went nowhere and the film was never made.

References

Bibliography

External links

1969 films
1969 drama films
French drama films
British drama films
Films directed by Tony Richardson
Films based on works by Vladimir Nabokov
Films with screenplays by Edward Bond
Films produced by Elliott Kastner
1960s English-language films
1960s British films
1960s French films
English-language French films